The 2020 American Athletic Conference Football Championship Game presented by CapitalOne was a college football game played on Saturday, December 19, 2020, at Nippert Stadium in Cincinnati, Ohio. The 6th American Athletic Conference Championship Game, it determined the 2020 champion of the American Athletic Conference (The American). This was the first year of the current division-less format of the game; instead of representatives from two divisions, the two teams with the best conference records earned a spot in the game.

In consideration of the COVID-19 pandemic in Ohio, attendance at the game was capped at 5,831 spectators by the Cincinnati Health Department, approximately 18% of the full capacity of Nippert Stadium (32,574).

Previous season
The 2019 American Athletic Conference Football Championship Game featured East Division winner Cincinnati against West Division co-winner Memphis. Eight days after beating the Bearcats 34–24 at home in the regular-season finale, Memphis rallied for another win. The Tigers beat the Bearcats, 29–24.

Teams

Cincinnati

The Cincinnati Bearcats clinched a berth in the Championship Game, after the November 28 game against Temple was canceled. This is Cincinnati's second consecutive Championship Game appearance.

Tulsa

The Tulsa Golden Hurricane clinched a berth in the Championship Game after defeating Navy on December 5. This is Tulsa's first appearance in the conference championship.

Game summary

Statistics

References

External links
Game statistics at statbroadcast.com

American Athletic Conference Football Championship Game
Championship
Cincinnati Bearcats football games
Tulsa Golden Hurricane football games
American Athletic Conference Football Championship Game
American Athletic Conference Football Championship Game
2020s in Cincinnati